Kozhym is an urban locality (an urban-type settlement) under the administrative jurisdiction of the town of republic significance of Inta in the Komi Republic, Russia. As of the 2010 Census, its population was 10.

Administrative and municipal status
Within the framework of administrative divisions, the urban-type settlement of Kozhym, together with three rural localities, is incorporated as Kozhym Urban-Type Settlement Administrative Territory, which is subordinated to the town of republic significance of Inta. Within the framework of municipal divisions, Kozhym is a part of Inta Urban Okrug.

References

Notes

Sources

Urban-type settlements in the Komi Republic
